The Yomiuri International was a golf tournament held in Japan from 1962 to 1971. It was played at the Yomiuri Country Club in Tokyo. It was an event on the Asia Golf Circuit (formerly the Far East Circuit) every year except for 1964, and served as the season finale.

In 1972, the tournament was cancelled by the sponsor, the Yomiuri Shinbun newspaper, because of political tensions and replaced on the circuit by the Sobu International Open.

Peter Thomson won the 1962 event, finishing eight strokes ahead of Canadian Al Balding. The following year the event was won by Doug Sanders, five ahead of Hideyo Sugimoto.

Winners

References

Asia Golf Circuit events
Defunct golf tournaments in Japan
Recurring sporting events established in 1962
Recurring sporting events disestablished in 1971
1962 establishments in Japan
1971 disestablishments in Japan